Mirzo Tursunzoda (2 May 1911 — 24 September 1977) was an important Tajikistani and Soviet poet and a prominent political figure, full member (academician) of the Tajik Academy of Sciences, a member of the Central Committee of the Communist Party of Tajikistan, a member of the Union of Soviet Writers. Today, Tursunzoda has been elevated to the level of Hero of Tajikistan. 

Tursunzoda's face appears on the front of the one Somoni note. The town of Tursunzoda (formerly Regar) is named in his honor.  Dushanbe's Memorial and Literature Museum was founded in 1981 in honor of Tursunzoda's 70th anniversary. 

He was awarded the Stalin prize.

References

External links

 Tajik banknotes - includes picture of one Somoni note with Tursunzade's face.

1911 births
1977 deaths
Soviet poets
20th-century Tajikistani poets
Tajikistani male writers
Tajik poets
Communist Party of Tajikistan politicians
Stalin Prize winners
20th-century Tajikistani writers
20th-century male writers
Members of the Tajik Academy of Sciences